Valeriana cernua is a species of plant in the family Caprifoliaceae. It is endemic to Ecuador. Its natural habitat is subtropical or tropical high-altitude grassland.

References

Endemic flora of Ecuador
cernua
Vulnerable plants
Taxonomy articles created by Polbot